Roger Mason may refer to:

Roger Mason (baseball) (born 1958), American baseball player
Roger Mason (geologist) (born 1941), discoverer of Ediacaran fossils
Roger Mason Jr. (born 1980), American basketball player
Roger Mason (musician), Australian keyboardist
L. Roger Mason, Jr., former assistant director of National Intelligence for Systems and Resource Analyses